A Nightmare on Elm Street 3: Dream Warriors is a 1987 American fantasy slasher film directed by Chuck Russell. The story was developed by Wes Craven and Bruce Wagner and is the third installment in the Nightmare on Elm Street franchise and stars Heather Langenkamp, Patricia Arquette, Larry Fishburne, Priscilla Pointer, Craig Wasson, and Robert Englund as Freddy Krueger. The film's plot centers around a group of young adults who have been committed to a psychiatric hospital where Nancy Thompson (Langenkamp), whose parents helped to kill Krueger, works. Krueger, an undead, supernatural serial killer who can murder people through their dreams, seeks to slaughter the teenagers, as they are the last remaining children of the parents who burned him to death.

Dream Warriors was theatrically released on February 27, 1987, and grossed $44.8 million domestically on a budget of over $4 million. It received mostly positive reviews from critics and is considered by many to be one of the best films in the Elm Street series.

The film was preceded by A Nightmare on Elm Street 2: Freddy's Revenge (1985) and followed by A Nightmare on Elm Street 4: The Dream Master (1988).

Plot 
In 1987, two years after the events of the previous film, teenager Kristen Parker dreams Freddy Krueger is chasing her. He attacks her in her bathroom after she thinks she already awoke, making it look like she slit her wrist in the real world.

Believing Kristen to be suicidal, her mother admits her to Westin Hills Psychiatric Hospital, where she is placed under the care of Dr. Neil Gordon. At the hospital, Kristen fights the orderlies who try to sedate her because she fears falling asleep. The new intern therapist, Nancy Thompson, calms her down and befriends her by reciting part of Freddy's nursery rhyme. Nancy is introduced to the rest of Dr. Gordon's patients: Phillip, a habitual sleepwalker; Kincaid, a tough kid from the streets who is prone to violence; Jennifer, a hopeful television actress prone to cigarette burns; Will, who uses a wheelchair due to a prior suicide attempt; Taryn, a recovering drug addict; and Joey, the youngest, who is too traumatized to speak. One night, Freddy attacks Kristen in her dreams, but she unwittingly pulls Nancy into her dream, allowing them to escape.

Kristen reveals that she has been able to pull people into her dreams since she was young. Over the next two nights, Freddy throws Phillip off a roof and kills Jennifer by smashing her head into a television. In their next group session, Nancy reveals to the remaining patients that they are 'the last of the Elm Street kids', the surviving children of those who banded together and burned Krueger to death many years ago. Both Nancy and Neil encourage them to try group hypnosis so that they can experience a shared dream and discover their dream powers. In the dream, Joey wanders off and is captured by Freddy, leaving him comatose in the real world; Nancy and Neil are relieved of duty. A nun, Sister Mary Helena, tells Neil that Freddy is the son of a young woman on the hospital staff who was accidentally locked in a room with hundreds of mental patients who raped her continually, and that the only way to stop him is to lay his bones to rest.

He and Nancy ask her father, officer Donald Thompson, where the bones are hidden, but he is uncooperative. Nancy rushes back to the hospital when she learns that Kristen has been sedated. Neil stays behind to convince Donald to help them. Nancy and the others again engage in group hypnosis to reunite with Kristen but are all separated by Freddy. Taryn and Will are killed by Freddy while Kristen, Nancy, and Kincaid find one another. The trio rescue Joey but are unable to defeat Freddy because he has become too powerful due to the souls he has absorbed. Sensing that his remains have been found, Freddy appropriates his own skeleton and kills Donald before incapacitating Neil. Freddy returns to attack the others but Joey uses his dream power voice to repel him. Donald tells Nancy that he is crossing over but he is revealed to be Freddy and stabs Nancy in the stomach, and tosses her aside. Freddy, believing that Nancy is dead, comes upon Kristen in order to kill her but a still-alive Nancy stabs him with his own glove. Neil manages to recover and purifies Freddy's bones, killing him. After Nancy dies, Kristen manages to awaken everyone and return them to the real world. During Nancy's funeral, Neil finds Amanda Krueger's tombstone and discovers that she is Sister Mary Helena. That evening, he goes to sleep with the Malaysian doll Nancy gave him and Kristen's papier-mâché house nearby, and suddenly Kristen's house lights up from the inside, suggesting that Freddy is not completely defeated.

Cast

 Heather Langenkamp as Nancy Thompson
 Craig Wasson as Dr. Neil Gordon
 Patricia Arquette as Kristen Parker
 Robert Englund as Freddy Krueger
 Ken Sagoes as Roland Kincaid
 Rodney Eastman as Joey Crusel
 Jennifer Rubin as Taryn White
 Bradley Gregg as Phillip Anderson
 Ira Heiden as Will Stanton
 Larry Fishburne as Max Daniels
 Penelope Sudrow as Jennifer Caulfield
 John Saxon as Donald Thompson
 Priscilla Pointer as Dr. Elizabeth Simms
 Clayton Landey as Lorenzo
 Brooke Bundy as Elaine Parker
 Nan Martin as Sister Mary Helena 
 Stacey Alden as Nurse Marcie
 Dick Cavett as Himself
 Zsa Zsa Gabor as Herself
 Paul Kent as Dr. Carver

Production

Development
Following the critical failure of A Nightmare on Elm Street 2: Freddy's Revenge, New Line Cinema was unsure if they would continue with the series. Wes Craven, who wrote and directed the original A Nightmare on Elm Street, did not participate in the first sequel. He had not wanted the original to evolve into a franchise, but due to immense dissatisfaction with Freddy's Revenge, signed on to co-write the screenplay for the third installment with the intention that it would end the series. However, the success of A Nightmare on Elm Street 3: Dream Warriors prompted a continuation of the series.

Craven's very first concept for the film was to have Freddy Krueger invade the real world: Krueger would haunt the actors filming a new Nightmare on Elm Street sequel. New Line Cinema rejected the metacinematic idea, but years later, Craven's concept was brought to the screen in Wes Craven's New Nightmare. Craven himself would be unavailable for directing, as he was tied up with filming Deadly Friend around the same time.

Before it was decided what script would be used for the film's story, both John Saxon and Robert Englund wrote their own scripts for a third Nightmare film; in Saxon's script called How the Nightmare on Elm Street All Began, which would have been a prequel story, Freddy would ultimately turn out to have been innocent, or at least set up for the murders by Charles Manson, who along with his followers would have been the main culprit of the murders; Freddy would be forced by the mob of angry parents to make a confession of the crimes, which would enrage them further. After they lynch Freddy, he comes back to avenge his wrongful death by targeting the parent's children. In Englund's treatment called Freddy's Funhouse, the protagonist would have been Tina Gray's older sister, who would have been in college by the time Tina was murdered, and ends up coming back to Springwood to investigate how she died. In the script, Freddy had claimed the 1428 Elm Street house for his own in the dreamworld, setting up booby traps like Nancy did against him. According to Englund, part of it later ended up being used in the pilot episode of Freddy's Nightmares after the script had been lying around unused for a few years.

Writing

Wes Craven has said, about the direction that he and Bruce Wagner wanted to take the franchise in, that "we decided that it could no longer be one person fighting Freddy. It had to be a group, because the souls of Freddy's victims have made Freddy stronger". He also called Heather Langenkamp to ask her if he may include her character Nancy in the script, which she agreed to. In interviews with cast and crew in the DVD extras, it is revealed that the original idea for the film centered around the kids separately traveling to a specific location to die by suicide. Later it would be discovered that the common link between the youths was that they dreamed of Freddy Krueger. Since suicide was a taboo social issue, the storyline was abandoned. Some aspects of the idea remained in the film.

In Craven and Wagner's original script, the characters were somewhat different from what was eventually filmed. Nancy was not a dream expert nor any kind of mental health professional. Kristen (named Kirsten in this script) only stayed in the institution for a short while, she had a father and her mother was named Alice. Neil's last name was Guinness and his character was much younger. Dr. Simms' last name was Maddalena, Taryn was African-American, Joey was the one who built the model of a house and had trouble getting around (although he did not use a wheelchair), and Philip was a thirteen-year-old. Will's name was originally Laredo, he had long hair, did not use a wheelchair, and was the one who made the clay puppets. This script also described the ranch house where Krueger was born and that is the house that shows up in the kids' dreams rather than the Elm Street house.  Wes Craven specifies the house in his original script to be "an architectural portal to [Freddy's dreamscape]. It is virtually a limitless world of the human psyche in all of its dimensions ... So you can enter this other world through the house or dreams or madness or hallucinations or special psychic states that various people have".

Contrary to the film, Donald Thompson knew from the start that Krueger was real and still alive. Krueger was missing and Nancy wanted to find him. When she finds him, Nancy learns that Krueger is obsessed with finding the house where he was born so he could burn it down. In the original script, there is a romance between Nancy and Neil and they have sex. There are scenes and lines that are reminiscent of the first film. There is no mention that Krueger's mother had been a nun or that Freddy was born of rape. Both Joey and Kincaid are killed. The deaths in this script were more grotesque; Krueger was not as talkative and he was more vulgar. Freddy is killed by Nancy by using his own glove, not by holy water, and she sees through his shapeshifting trick even though she still dies.

On  Never Sleep Again: The Elm Street Legacy, director Chuck Russell states that Craven's original script was darker and more profane, while Rachel Talalay thought that the script seemed like a "20 million dollar script". Discussing the more humorous elements in the film, Russell stated, "I looked at what [series creator] Wes Craven did and said, 'This is absolutely great and terrifying.' But I felt that by the time I came along on 3, the way to go was to make the whole idea of dreams and nightmares into a carnival and go further into the dreams and make Freddy Krueger more outrageous and add more of an element of dark humor. That worked and the series went in that direction from then on."

One of the most memorable scenes in the film and a fan favorite is the sequence that takes place in the junkyard during the film's climax. The junkyard sequence and the set itself were the product of art director Mick Strawn. Mick also handled some special effects sequences on the film, and became production designer on the sequel. The sequence was so popular that it appeared again in A Nightmare on Elm Street 4: The Dream Master. The junkyard sequence was filmed in Pacoima, California, for both films.

Casting

Lisa Wilcox and Lezlie Deane, who would later be cast as Alice Johnson and Tracy respectively in the following installments, have both reported to have had auditions for roles in Dream Warriors previously. Patricia Arquette was close to being recast early into the shooting, but Chuck Russell intervened and had her stay. According to producer Sara Risher, the role that the producers spent the most time interviewing and auditioning for was Marcie (Stacy Alden), the "sexy nurse" who seemingly seduces Joey in his dream but turns out to be Freddy. Nurse Marcie, while seducing Joey, was originally supposed to turn into a "She-Freddy", with Alden wearing Freddy's mask; Roy H. Wagner had second thoughts about this after seeing how "She-Freddy" looked like in practice, stating that "Freddy with breasts, it was too off-kilter". The concept of "She-Freddy" was substituted with having the nurse shoot prehensile tongues at Joey to trap him and then be switched with Englund-Freddy.

In the shooting script, Sally Kellerman was supposed to appear on Dick Cavett's talkshow, but Cavett allegedly handpicked Zsa Zsa Gabor personally after being given the opportunity to choose who he thought should appear in his show and be slaughtered by Freddy. According to Robert Englund, all of her reactions and dialogue were completely improvised:

“Ms. Gabor, who was probably just grateful to be asked to appear in a movie again, apparently didn’t read the script or bother to do any research on the Nightmare flicks. I guess her agent told her, “I have a job for you,” and all she said was “Great. Vhat time zhould I zhow up, dahlink?” not realizing that she was about to throw down with a burnt-to-a-crisp serial killer. During the fake talk show where she’s interviewed by Dick Cavett, all her reactions seen on film were 100 percent genuine. She didn’t know who the fuck Freddy was, so when I jumped out, she had a mild freak-out.”

Filming
The storyboards used for the shooting was supplied by Pete von Sholly. Russell originally hired a cinematographer whom line producer Rachel Talalay perceived to be "Eastern European"; Talalay had the cinematographer fired after he had insulted Penelope Sudrow and replaced him with Roy H. Wagner. The Royce Hall building on the University of California, Los Angeles campus was used for the exteriors of the Westin Hills Psychiatric Hospital, while St. Brendan Catholic Church was used for the church scenes. The scenes in Freddy's boiler room were filmed at a converted warehouse across the street from Los Angeles County Jail. Mark Shostrom, who was also doing work on the set of Evil Dead II, possibly smuggled the Freddy glove used in Dream Warriors and used it as a background prop for one day, explaining why the glove appeared in that film released the same year.

Special effects
The special effects were created by a team led by Peter Chesney and included Kevin Yagher and Mark Shostrom. For the iconic deathscene for Jennifer, where her body is hoisted into the air, Shostrom created a dummy of Penelope Sudrow with fully flexible limbs out of fiberglass and urethane and then put a matching wig on the dummy. The team built five fake televisions, each with different functions, with one being equipped with a rubber membrane which a dummy of Freddy's head pushed up through, after which they substituted the dummy with Robert Englund. Another was equipped with the metal arms which included Freddy's fingerblades and vacuum tubes from real televisions. The line "welcome to prime time, bitch" spoken by Freddy in the scene was not included in the script, but was ad libbed by Robert Englund. For Taryn's death scene, the team had originally tried for an effect where her head would explode after being injected with drugs, but could not make this effect work in practice; instead they put appliances on Jennifer Rubin's body to show the withering effects of the injection. The skeletal version of the girl that Kristen is holding in the intro sequence was originally a surreal mechanical corpse dummy created by Shostrom, but turned out to be too good for its purpose; Russell was so unnerved by its appearance that he did not dare to put it in the film, but had it replaced by a simpler "decayed skeleton". Shostrom went to the Simon Wiesenthal museum for inspiration, looking at photographs of burned children from Auschwitz and needed ten weeks to complete the original dummy, while its replacement was created within hours at Russell's insistence.

Post-production

Both Heather Langenkamp and co-star Craig Wasson refer to a scene they filmed in which they kissed but was not included in the film, with Wasson stating that "No, we didn't have sex, but there was this one real hot kiss that just about melted the camera lens. Too bad they cut it".

Music

The theme song, "Dream Warriors", was written and performed by the American heavy metal band Dokken. The single was a success and a decision was made to include heavy metal songs in the soundtrack of the sequels. The band's manager Cliff Burnstein was acquainted with Wes Craven and was able to get a copy of the film script as reference for the lyrics. Robert Englund as Freddy then helped providing unique footage with the band for the music video. Clips of Patricia Arquette as Kristen Parker were also used, with some notable changes such as her model house being built with Dokken fanzines instead of papier-mâché.

In the opening sequence of the original VHS release of the film, a hard rock instrumental version of the Joe Lamont song "Quiet Cool" plays. When the film was released on DVD, "Quiet Cool" is replaced by "Into the Fire" by Dokken which was the song in the original theatrical release.

A Nightmare on Elm Street 3: Dream Warriors was scored by David Lynch's frequent collaborator and friend Angelo Badalamenti and released around three weeks prior to the film's theatrical release. The film score was rereleased alongside all the other soundtracks in the franchise in 2017 on the label Death Waltz Recording Company as a box set called A Nightmare on Elm Street: Box of Souls.

Release

Marketing
New Line Cinema's distributing partner Media Home Entertainment recorded a promo reel with Robert Englund as Freddy advertising the VHS release of the film primarily to video rental shop and other vendors, including a promised chance to one winner to appear in the sequel (The Dream Master).

Reception

Box office
The film was released theatrically in the United States by New Line Cinema in February 1987. It was their first film to open nationally, opening in 1,343 theaters and debuting at number one, with a weekend gross of $8.9 million, a record for an independent film at the time. It made $44,793,222 at the domestic box office making it both the highest-grossing film for the studio that year and the 24th highest-grossing film of 1987. It is the third highest-grossing film of the Nightmare on Elm Street franchise after Freddy vs. Jason and A Nightmare on Elm Street 4: The Dream Master.

In the Australian state of Queensland, the movie was banned by the Bjelke-Petersen government because of its drug references, specifically the scene where Freddy's glove becomes a number of syringes and he injects Taryn with a heroin overdose. In 1990, the newly elected Goss government abolished the Queensland Film Board of Review and the film became available through normal market channels. The Australian public at the time thought the ban was absurd, as the film was not very graphic.

Critical response
The film has an approval rating of 72% on Rotten Tomatoes based on 38 reviews; the average rating is 6.8/10. The consensus reads, "A Nightmare on Elm Street 3: Dream Warriors offers an imaginative and surprisingly satisfying rebound for a franchise already starting to succumb to sequelitis."  Variety wrote that Russell's poor direction makes the film's intended and unintended humor difficult to differentiate.  Roger Ebert of the Chicago Sun-Times rated it one and a half out of four stars; he liked the production values but said that it "never generated any sympathy for its characters."  Janet Maslin of The New York Times wrote, "The film's dream sequences are ingenious, and they feature some remarkable nightmare images and special effects."  Although he criticizes Langenkamp's acting, Kim Newman wrote in Empire that the "film delivers amazing scenes in spades, bringing to life the sort of bizarre images which used to be found only on comic book covers".

Influence on later works

In the franchise, Westin Hills Psychiatric Hospital and the dream suppressing drug Hypnocil introduced in Dream Warriors would reappear in Freddy vs. Jason, where it is shown that prolonged use of the drug will render its user irreversibly comatose. In the comics Freddy vs. Jason vs. Ash: The Nightmare Warriors, the drug is referenced when Maggie Burroughs taunts Dr. Neil Gordon for being a "Hypnocil junkie" and that if he hadn't been, he would have seen her betrayal and corruption by her demonic father coming. The drug appears in the film Stitches (2012), where the main character Tommy takes a drug by that name to suppress visions of the undead killer clown Stitches.
Josh Boone, co-writer and director of the superhero film The New Mutants (2020) about the Marvel Comics superhero team New Mutants, has cited Dream Warriors as one of the major influences on his film, which has been described as a supernatural horror film. An earlier screenplay by Michael Almereyda for what became Freddy's Dead: The Final Nightmare (1991) involved bringing back members of the Dream Warriors as a form of "dream police" to help Jacob Johnson in fighting Freddy. In Friday the 13th: The Game, in the Friday the 13th franchise, the "Tommy Tapes" hints at Tommy Jarvis being sent to Westin Hills Psychiatric Hospital, to be cared for by Dr. Neil Gordon. Roy H. Wagner re-created scenes from the film with Kristen and the "Little girl" from her dreams in 2019 while using only an iPhone 11 Pro for the production.

Accolades
 1988 Saturn Awards
Best Horror Film (nomination)
 Best Make-up (nomination)
 Best Supporting Actor – Robert Englund (nomination)
 Fantasporto Awards 1988
 International Fantasy Film Award Best Film – Chuck Russell (nomination)
 Critics Awards: Special Mention – Chuck Russell (won)

Other media

Literature
The film was spoofed by MAD magazine in October 1987. A joint novelization of the first three films, The Nightmares on Elm Street Parts 1, 2, 3: The Continuing Story,  was released in 1987, written by Jeffrey Cooper. In the Dream Warriors chapter, the original Craven and Wagner version of the Nightmare 3 script is adapted, rather than the Russell and Darabont rewrite. As such, the book version of the story is notably different from the finished film.

Comics
Many characters from the Dream Warriors film appear in Andy Mangels' 1991 comic book story Nightmares on Elm Street which continues the "Dream trilogy" and brings back most characters from Dream Warriors, with the Dream Warriors group sans Kristen appearing in the last two issues of the series. In the storyline, Kristen's psychic powers and her wish of putting Nancy into a "beautiful dream" allowed Nancy's soul to ascend to the positive side of the dream world, wherein her soul is free and able to oppose Freddy. Aside from Nancy and the Dream Warriors group, Nancy's father Donald, Dr. Simms and Dr. Neil Gordon also appear while Amanda Krueger is mentioned. In the 2009 comic book series Freddy vs. Jason vs. Ash: The Nightmare Warriors, Dr. Neil Gordon plays a major role while Nancy, Amanda Krueger and the Dream Warriors group makes cameo appearances after Jacob Johnson releases some of the spirits of Freddy Krueger's victims to help in defeating Freddy.

Video games

The two video games released for the franchise, the Commodore 64/IBM-PC (1989) and the NES adaption (1990), are both, independently of each other, based primarily on the "Dream Warriors" concept, characters and film, though the games are both simply called A Nightmare on Elm Street. The C64/IBM-PC game allows the player to play as one of the Dream Warriors characters, including Nancy who, unique to the game, has a "dream power" of freezing enemies. The NES game centers around collecting Freddy's scattered bones to destroy them (bury them in the original game concept) while dream warrior powers can be acquired through collecting power-ups.

Merchandise
Fright-Rags has released a number of limited edition Dream Warriors-themed clothing, including one design that is a pastiche of the cover of the first 1963 issue of Uncanny X-Men, substituting the X-Men with the Dream Warriors and Magneto with Freddy Krueger. They have also released a print inspired by their own earlier work on The Warriors (1979) design. Mondo created a printing for MondoCon 2016 based on the 1428 Elm Street house from the film. NECA released an adaptable 7 inch Freddy Krueger figure from the film in 2016 and another 18 inch figure in 2017. Sets including Elaine Parker's decapitated head and "Tuxedo Freddy" and of Kristen being devoured by the Freddy-snake were released as part of the Cinema of Fear series. A sleeping pill named Dream Warrior has been released, with one function being advertised as "Battle Sleeplessness" and promises the user to “Win Back Your Dreams”. A replica of Nancy Thompson's personal Hypnocil bottle from the film was one of the items released in the January 2018 Bam! Horror Box.

See also

List of ghost films
List of monster movies

References

External links

 
 
 
 
 

1987 films
1987 horror films
1987 fantasy films
1980s slasher films
American teen horror films
American fantasy films
American sequel films
American slasher films
1980s English-language films
Films about child abuse
Films about child abduction in the United States
Films about nightmares
Films about psychic powers
American films about revenge
Films set in 1987
Films set in Ohio
Films set in psychiatric hospitals
Films about hypnosis
Insomnia in film
New Line Cinema films
A Nightmare on Elm Street (franchise) films
Films about self-harm
Films scored by Angelo Badalamenti
Films directed by Chuck Russell
Films with screenplays by Frank Darabont
1987 directorial debut films
1980s American films